2GB is a commercial radio station in Sydney, Australia, owned by parent company Nine Radio, a division of Nine Entertainment Co., who also own sister station 2UE.

2GB broadcasts on 873 kHz, AM. 

In 2010, 2GB held 14.7% of the total radio ratings share, making it the one of the most widely listened-to radio stations in Sydney.

History 

2GB commenced intermittent broadcasting in August 1926. The operator, Theosophical Broadcasting Station Pty Ltd, owned by interests associated with the local branch of Theosophical Society Adyar, was granted a radio broadcasting licence for the Sydney area.
George A. Saunders, previously with 2BL, became 2GB's first station manager and (as "Uncle George") on-air personality in 1927.

2GB became the first Australian station to play transcription records by 1933, holding the world's largest transcribed record library at the time.

The controlling interest in the station was purchased by Denison Estates Ltd in 1936. A new board of directors was appointed under chairman Sir Hugh Denison and included Frederick Daniell and A. E. Bennett, who continued as station manager.

In what radio historian and writer Richard Lane termed "The Golden Age of Australian Radio Drama", Denison and his media adviser Daniell inaugurated the Broadcasting Service Association Players, renamed the Macquarie Players in 1938. 

2GB produced locals weekly serials such as Dolly and Dan and Doctor Mac, and presented a full-length drama on Sunday afternoons. Writers included John E. C. Appleton, Lynn Foster, E. Mason Wood, William L. Power (who dramatised Helen de Guerry Simpson's Boomerang, a series on "Famous Escapes", and Tales Told to Peter and Pam, a popular children's series), E. V. Timms and Ken Pawley. 

Actors included James Raglan, Lou Vernon, Peter Finch, Betty Suttor and Harry Dearth.

The station launched the Macquarie Radio Network, in February 1938, in competition with the Major Network, started by fellow Sydney station 2UE.

In 1940, the station became the largest producer of radio drama programs in the Southern Hemisphere. During World War II, 2GB provided transcription records to the Australian Army's network of radio stations in Papua New Guinea and the Pacific Islands.

Station announcer Ted Harris, aided by American Ted Schroeder, became the first man to give a direct ball-by-ball description of the Davis Cup from Forest Hills to Australia on August 27, 1955. Two years later, 2GB became the first Australian station to air news bulletins on the hour, every hour during its broadcast day.

Prior to 1964, the controlling interest (45%) was held by Broadcasting Associates Pty Ltd., with 14% owned by the John Fairfax group of companies, and the balance owned by various smaller shareholders. Broadcasting Associates was owned by A.T.V. (Australia) Pty. Ltd., the Australian subsidiary of ITV company Associated Television. In 1964, Fairfax purchased ATV's Australian assets, including the 45% share in 2GB.

Although the ownership of the station has subsequently passed to strictly commercial interests, the Theosophical Society was still presenting programmes on the station as late as 1975.

Ray Hadley, previously with 2UE, became a presenter at the station in 2001.

2GB had a standby mast and its original 873 AM transmitter tower at Wentworth Point at Homebush Bay. Its location was visible via the Ryde Bridge, and also via the train line to Rhodes and Concord train stations. Due to a redevelopment occurring on the same land, the tower was brought down on Friday 11 September 2015. A month or two before, a new tower was erected for 2GB and is now situated at the 2KY transmitter site, also in Homebush.
In October 2012, following the Alan Jones "died of shame" controversy, 2GB suspended advertising on the Alan Jones show. This decision was reversed in October 2012, but many advertisers declined to return to sponsoring the program.

In June 2014, Michael Smith was fired as fill-in commentator for calling Muhammad a paedophile; Program Director David Kidd referred to Muhammad as a deity.

Merger

On 1 April 2015 The Macquarie Radio Network merged with the Fairfax Radio Network of Fairfax Media. The news teams of 2UE and 2GB are being merged with "significant job cuts." Consequently, on 9 April 2015 the 2UE newsroom was closed.

Callsign and frequency 
The number 2 of the callsign refers to the state of New South Wales, which also has postcodes starting with 2.  The two letters GB indicate an AM station, and were chosen to honour the Italian philosopher Giordano Bruno, who was much admired by Theosophists. Its original frequency allocation was 950 kHz and moved to 870 kHz in 1935, then to 873 on 23 November 1978, when channel separation was reduced from 10 kHz to 9 kHz as a result of an international medium wave frequency realignment.

Former presenters 
 Brian Carlton
 Philip Clark
 Jack Davey
 Bob Dyer
 Terry Dear
 Ken Howard (race caller)
 John Tapp (race caller)
 John Pearce
 Gwen Plumb
 Dita Cobb
 Ian McRae
 Grant Goldman (formerly with 2SM)
 Tim Webster (now with 2CH)
 Malcolm T. Elliott
 John Laws (now with 2SM)
 Mike Carlton
 Bob Rogers
 Peter Hand
 Owen Delaney (Australia Overnight)
 Jason Morrison  
 Jim Ball
 Luke Bona (now with MMM)
 Alan Jones
 Terry Willesee
 Kerri-Anne Kennerley
 Stan Zemanek
 Graham Richardson
 Clive Robertson
 Glenn Wheeler
 Brian Wilshire
 Ross Greenwood
  Steve Price
 Ron Casey

References

External links 
 Brief History – transcript of talk by Alan Jones on the early history of this station and others
 Talkback Radio 2GB 873 AM
 Macquarie National News

Radio stations in Sydney
Radio stations established in 1926
News and talk radio stations in Australia
Nine Radio
Giordano Bruno